Stoner's EP is the debut extended play (EP) by American rapper Snoop Dogg. The EP was released on April 17, 2012, by Gangsta Gangsta Online Distribution.

Critical response

Stoner's EP received an average rating from music critic Phillip Mlynar of HipHopDX. He gave the album two out of five stars, saying "Weed-based rap music doesn't always have to be languid and laid back, like much of the production on Stoners EP. After all, rappers like Curren$y and Action Bronson are creating some of the hypest rap music out there while parading around with a joint permanently dangling from his lips. But with this curious EP release, Snoop has committed the more heinous sin of confusing being relaxed with turning lazy. Someone wake him up for next time."

Commercial performance 
Stoner's debuted at number 167 on the US Billboard 200, selling 2,500 copies in its first week.

Track listing

Charts

References

2012 debut EPs
Snoop Dogg albums
Cannabis music
EPs by American artists